Kalinagar Mahavidyalaya, established in 1985, is a general degree college in Kalinagar. It offers undergraduate courses in arts. It is affiliated to West Bengal State University.

Departments

Bengali
English 
Sanskrit
History
Geography
Political Science
Philosophy
Education

Accreditation
Kalinagar Mahavidyalaya is recognized by the University Grants Commission (UGC).

See also
Education in India
List of colleges in West Bengal
Education in West Bengal

References

External links
Kalinagar Mahavidyalaya

Universities and colleges in North 24 Parganas district
Colleges affiliated to West Bengal State University
Educational institutions established in 1985
1985 establishments in West Bengal